Gillfoot railway station was on the Whitehaven, Cleator and Egremont Railway line half a mile north of Egremont station, in Cumbria, England.

History and location
The line was one of the fruits of the rapid industrialisation of West Cumberland in the second half of the nineteenth century, opening to passengers on 1 July 1857.

Gillfoot station appears in the 1882 Railway Clearing House junction diagrams as "Gillfoot Sta. and Jn", shown right, but not in the 1904 edition. It is shown as a goods station in Jowett.

The station site appears in the Engineers' Line Reference database which can be accessed via External links, below.

The station does not appear in other standard works, notably Butt and Croughton, nor is it mentioned in any of the other works listed below, online or on paper.

The station site was at the junction of the branch to Gillfoot iron ore mines. This had not been started when the 1867 OS 6" map was surveyed. The junction is plain to see in the overlaid c1900 OS map, '''but no station or building is evident.

Afterlife
By 2013 the trackbed through the junction was a public footpath.

See also

 Furness Railway
 Cleator and Workington Junction Railway
 Whitehaven, Cleator and Egremont Railway

References

Sources

Further reading

External links
The station on the line with Engineer's Line References, via railwaycodes.org.uk
Map of the line with photos, via RAILSCOT
The station not on an 1867 OS map, via National Library of Scotland
The station not on overlain OS maps surveyed from 1898, via National Library of Scotland
The station not on a 1948 OS Map, via npe maps
The railways of Cumbria, via Cumbrian Railways Association
Photos of Cumbrian railways, via Cumbrian Railways Association
The railways of Cumbria, via Railways_of_Cumbria
Cumbrian Industrial History, via Cumbria Industrial History Society
Furness Railtour using many West Cumberland lines 5 September 1954, via sixbellsjunction
A video tour-de-force of the region's closed lines, via cumbriafilmarchive
Haematite, via earthminerals

Disused railway stations in Cumbria